Endless is a 2020 American fantasy romantic drama film directed by Scott Speer and starring Alexandra Shipp and Nicholas Hamilton.

Plot
Riley (Alexandra Shipp) and Chris (Nicholas Hamilton) are two high school graduates madly in love, but a tragic car accident separates them. She blames herself for the untimely death of her boyfriend while he remains stuck in limbo. Miraculously, the two find a way to reconnect.

Cast
Alexandra Shipp as Riley Jean Stanheight 
Nicholas Hamilton as Chris Douglas
DeRon Horton as Jordan
Famke Janssen as Lee Douglas
Eddie Ramos as Nate
Zoe Belkin as Julia 
Ian Tracey as Richard
Catherine Lough Haggquist as Helen
Aaron Pearl as Chris' Father
Barbara Meier as Teri

Release
The film was released in select theaters and on VOD by Quiver Distribution on August 14, 2020.

Reception

Box office
Endless grossed $0 in North America and $944,761 worldwide.

Critical response
The website's critical consensus reads, "While it hopes to make viewers swoon over a bond that defies death, all but the most passionate fans of YA romance may struggle to arouse even puppy love for Endless." On Metacritic, it holds a rating of 27 out of 100, based on 5 critics, indicating "generally unfavorable reviews".

Tara McNamara of Common Sense Media awarded the film two stars out of five. Tomris Laffly of RogerEbert.com awarded the film one star. Kate Erbland of IndieWire graded the film a D+. Lisa Kennedy of Variety gave the film a positive review and wrote, "But amiable leads Alexandra Shipp and Nicholas Hamilton — along with a thoughtfully in-sync supporting cast — keep things unfolding in a kind-hearted place when the screenplay could have easily marooned the audience in a copycat purgatory." John DeFore of The Hollywood Reporter gave the film a negative review and wrote, "For only the most undiscriminating YA romantics."

References

External links
 
 

2020 films
2020 fantasy films
2020 romantic drama films
2020s English-language films
American fantasy films
American romantic drama films
Films directed by Scott Speer
Films produced by Basil Iwanyk
Quiver Distribution films
Thunder Road Films films
2020s American films